At Any Cost? is a play by Australian playwright David Williamson.

It was inspired by Williamson's experiences with the health system stemming from his heart condition. Unlike most of Williamson's plays, it was written in collaboration, with a doctor.

References

External links
Review of 2011 Sydney production at Daily Telegraph
Review of 2011 Sydney production at Crikey
Review of 2011 Sydney production at Sydney Morning Herald

Plays by David Williamson
2011 plays